Pınaryolu can refer to:

 Pınaryolu, Narman
 Pınaryolu, Refahiye